Barmpton is a small village and civil parish in the borough of Darlington and the ceremonial county of 
County Durham, England. The population taken at the 2011 Census was less than 100. Details are maintained in the parish of Great Burdon.  It is situated a short distance to the north-east of Darlington, on the River Skerne, a tributary of the Tees.

References

External links

Villages in County Durham
Places in the Borough of Darlington
Places in the Tees Valley
Civil parishes in County Durham